Rzeniszów  is a village in the administrative district of Gmina Koziegłowy, within Myszków County, Silesian Voivodeship, in southern Poland. The village has a population of 390.

References

Villages in Myszków County